Kuchiki (朽木, decayed tree) may refer to:

Characters in the Japanese anime Bleach
Byakuya Kuchiki
Rukia Kuchiki
Ginrei Kuchiki
Hisana Kuchiki

Other uses
Kuchiki taoshi, a single leg takedown in Judo
Kuchiki no Tō, 2004 album by the Japanese band Mucc
Natasha Kuchiki (born 1976), professional figure skater